Les Boulter may refer to:

 Les Boulter (Family Affairs), a character from the UK soap opera Family Affairs
 Les Boulter (footballer) (1913–1975), Welsh football inside left